Juan Uría Ríu (October 7, 1891 – 1979) was a Spanish historian.

20th-century Spanish archaeologists
People from Oviedo
1891 births
1979 deaths